STS-110 was a Space Shuttle mission to the International Space Station (ISS) on 8–19 April 2002 flown by Space Shuttle Atlantis. The main purpose was to install the S0 Truss segment, which forms the backbone of the truss structure on the station.

Crew

Mission highlights 

The main purpose of STS-110 was to attach the stainless steel S0 Truss segment to the International Space Station (ISS) to the Destiny Laboratory Module. It forms the backbone of the station to which the S1 and P1 truss segments were attached (on the following missions STS-112 and STS-113, respectively).

The MT was designed and manufactured by Astro Aerospace in Carpinteria, CA. During the next shuttle mission, STS-111, the Mobile Base System (MBS) was mounted to the MT. This Mobile Servicing System (MSS) allows the Canadarm2 to travel down the length of the installed truss structure.

Flight Day 1: Launch 
After a launch scrub on 4 April 2002 due to a hydrogen leak, Space Shuttle Atlantis successfully launched on 8 April 2002, from Launch Complex 39B. The countdown on 8 April encountered an unscheduled hold at the T-5-minute mark due to data dropouts in a backup Launch Processing System. The Launch Processing System team reloaded the required data and the countdown resumed. Liftoff occurred with 11 seconds remaining in the launch window.

STS-110 was the first shuttle mission to feature the upgrade Block II main engines, which featured an "improved fuel pump...a stronger integral shaft/disk, and more robust bearings". The intent of the upgrade was to increase the flight capacity of the engines, while increasing reliability and safety.

With the launch of Atlantis, mission specialist Jerry Ross became the first human to have traveled to space seven times.

Spacewalks

Media

See also 

List of human spaceflights
List of International Space Station spacewalks
List of Space Shuttle missions
List of spacewalks and moonwalks 1965–1999
Outline of space science

References

External links 
 
 NASA mission summary 
 NASA shuttle mission archive
 Status reports – Detailed NASA status reports for each day of the mission.
 STS-110 Video Highlights 

Space Shuttle missions
Spacecraft launched in 2002
Articles containing video clips